Zhisheng Niu  is a professor in the electrical engineering department of Tsinghua University. He became a Fellow of the Institute of Electronics, Information and Communication Engineers in 2007. In addition, he was named Fellow of the IEEE Communications Society (IEEE ComSoc) in 2012 "for contributions to collaborative radio resource management in wireless networks". He is also a Fellow of the Institute of Electronics, Information and Communication Engineers (IEICE), appointed 2007.

He holds a BS degree in Communication from  Beijing Jiaotong University, (1985), a M.S., in Information Engineering, from Toyohashi University of Technology, Toyohashi, Japan (1989) and a Ph.D from the same department (1992).

From 2009-13, he was editor of IEEE Wireless Communication Magazine; from 2012–14, he was Associate Editor-in-Chief of the IEEE/CIC Joint Publication China Communications.

References

External links

Fellow Members of the IEEE
Living people
Chinese electrical engineers
Beijing Jiaotong University alumni
Toyohashi University of Technology alumni
Academic staff of Tsinghua University
Year of birth missing (living people)
Place of birth missing (living people)
Fujitsu people